The 1954 Vermont gubernatorial election took place on November 2, 1954. Incumbent Republican Lee E. Emerson did not run for re-election to a third term as Governor of Vermont. Republican candidate Joseph B. Johnson defeated Democratic candidate E. Frank Branon to succeed him.

Republican primary

Results

Democratic primary

Results

General election

Results

References

Vermont
1954
Gubernatorial
November 1954 events in the United States